The 1932 Miami Redskins football team was an American football team that represented Miami University as a member of the Buckeye Athletic Association (BAA) during the 1932 college football season. In its first season under head coach Frank Wilton, Miami compiled a 7–1 record (5–0 against conference opponents) and won the BAA championship. After losing its opening game to Illinois, the team won its remaining seven games.

Schedule

References

Miami
Miami RedHawks football seasons
Miami Redskins football